Raemond Fitzgerald German (November 30, 1940 – September 21, 2021) was a Canadian football player who played for the Hamilton Tiger-Cats. He won the Grey Cup with them in 1965. He played previously at the University of Guelph, where he got a master's degree in agricultural mechanical engineering in 1966. In 2005, he was a project manager for the Jimmy Carter Habitat for Humanity program.

References

1940 births
2021 deaths
Hamilton Tiger-Cats players